OFT may refer to:

Spaceflight
Orion Flight Test 1 (5 December 2014), first test flight of the Orion Multi-Purpose Crew Vehicle
Boeing Orbital Flight Test (Boe-OFT; 20 December 2019), an uncrewed CST-100 Starliner spacecraft flight test

Other uses
The former Office of Fair Trading in the United Kingdom
Ordnance Factory Tiruchirappalli, a defense company based in Tiruchirappalli, Tamil Nadu
Optimal foraging theory, a theory that organisms forage so as to maximize their net energy intake per unit time
Ohio Federation of Teachers

See also